The Dead Hate the Living! is a 2000 low budget zombie film written and directed by Dave Parker and produced by Full Moon Entertainment. The film is dedicated to producer Kirk Edward Hansen, who died on December 18, 1999.

Plot
The film opens with a scientist, Eibon, recording a message stating that he had successfully brought the dead back to life and that he plans to become one of them. He is then attacked by a zombie that had managed to break into his lab. About a month later a group of young filmmakers, actors Shelly and Eric, director David, and FX artists Paul and Marcus, break into an abandoned hospital, unaware that it was the same one that Eibon used for his experiments.

Their attempts to make a horror film are interrupted when David and Shelly's sister Nina arrives on set, upset that Shelly had taken her role in the film. She continues to act antagonistically to other crew members, which includes a gofer named Topaz, insisting that the filming and special effects be retooled for her. This causes a pause in filming, during which time the crew investigates the hospital, finding both Eibon's laboratory and his corpse, which is inside a strange coffin. David decides to use the corpse as a prop, which disgusts Shelly and makes her quit the film.  Later during filming Eric accidentally brings Eibon back to life via the coffin, which emits a strange purple light and opens a vortex through which two zombies emerge. Eric is promptly killed by the zombies and brought back to life by Eibon. It's also revealed that Eibon became interested in bringing the dead back to life after his beloved wife Ellie died from cancer.

The zombies pick off the crew one by one, including Shelly, until only Topaz, David, and Paul are left. Topaz is captured and brought to Eibon's laboratory, as she had killed a zombie Ellie. Paul and David disguise themselves as zombies to infiltrate the lair and eliminate enemies, however Paul dies in the process. David manages to successfully free Topaz and destroy Eibon, however when they try to leave the hospital they find themselves in a different dimension inhabited by the dead.

Cast
Eric Clawson as David Poe
Jamie Donahue as Topaz
Brett Beardslee as Paul
Wendy Speake as Shelly Poe
Benjamin P. Morris as Eric
Rick Irwin as Marcus
David Douglas as Chas
Matt Stephens as Dr. Eibon
Kimberly Pullis as Nina Poe
Andre 'Doc' Newman as Maggot
Matthew McGrory as Gaunt (his acting debut)
Ariana Albright as Ellie Eibon
Mitch Persons as The Zombie

Critical response
Fatally Yours offered in their review that [the film] "is straight up one of the best Full Moon Entertainment movies out there for sure", praising the director and casting. They concluded by remarking that while the film might "seem like your typical cheesy horror film it does have its memorable moments that make you happy to be able to be viewing it."  Beyond Hollywood wrote that the film began with "the biggest cliche' of movie cliche's" in that the protagonists were themselves filmmakers filming a horror movie scene as part of the horror movie itself. They made note of the low budget and that the film was no exception to films of this genre not being known for presenting great acting, underscoring that the first 20 minutes were "excruciatingly bad", though granting that the acting did get better, leading the reviewer to suppose that the project was possibly shot in the same order as scripted, allowing the actors to become more comfortable with their characters as the film progressed.  eFilmCritic found the film to be "easily one of the absolute worst films to ever smudge a rental store shelf", opining that the film's script was cliche' and unoriginal, the pacing would "cause even snails to squirm with impatience", and concluding the review by writing the film was "horribly directed, horribly shot, and just plain horribly executed."  Mike Bracken of IGN wrote, "Ultimately, this is one of the better zombie flicks to come along in awhile".  Glenn Kay wrote that the film is enthusiastic, but "most viewers will agree that the living hate The Dead Hate the Living!"

References

Further reading

External links
 
 

2000 horror films
2000 films
American zombie films
2000s English-language films
Films directed by Dave Parker
2000s American films